Vernon Township is one of the sixteen townships of Crawford County, Ohio, United States. As of the 2010 census the population was 832.

Geography
Located in the eastern part of the county, it borders the following townships:
Auburn Township - north
Plymouth Township, Richland County - northeast corner
Sharon Township, Richland County - east
Jackson Township - southeast
Jefferson Township - southwest
Sandusky Township - west
Cranberry Township - northwest corner

No municipalities are located in Vernon Township, but it does contain the unincorporated communities of DeKalb and West Liberty.

Name and history
Vernon Township was established in 1825.

Statewide, other Vernon Townships are located in Clinton and Trumbull counties.

Government
The township is governed by a three-member board of trustees, who are elected in November of odd-numbered years to a four-year term beginning on the following January 1. Two are elected in the year after the presidential election and one is elected in the year before it. There is also an elected township fiscal officer, who serves a four-year term beginning on April 1 of the year after the election, which is held in November of the year before the presidential election. Vacancies in the fiscal officership or on the board of trustees are filled by the remaining trustees.

References

External links
County website

Townships in Crawford County, Ohio
Townships in Ohio